Gammarus setosus is a gammarid amphipod that inhabits the northern coasts of both the Atlantic and Pacific oceans. Typically, this crustacean is found in the benthic sub-tidal or low inter-tidal regions. Gammarus setosus reproduces once a year in the autumn.

References

setosus
Crustaceans described in 1931